Ciclopramine is a tetracyclic antidepressant (TeCA) that was never marketed.

References 

Abandoned drugs
Amines
Tetracyclic antidepressants
Dibenzazepines